Montana Township is a township in Jewell County, Kansas, USA.  As of the 2000 census, its population was 93.

Geography
Montana Township covers an area of 36.43 square miles (94.35 square kilometers); of this, 0.05 square miles (0.13 square kilometers) or 0.14 percent is water.

Adjacent townships
 Jackson Township (east)
 Sinclair Township (southeast)
 Richland Township (south)
 Holmwood Township (southwest)
 Harrison Township (west)

Cemeteries
The township contains one cemetery, Montana.

Major highways
 K-14

References
 U.S. Board on Geographic Names (GNIS)
 United States Census Bureau cartographic boundary files

External links
 US-Counties.com
 City-Data.com

Townships in Jewell County, Kansas
Townships in Kansas